Savu Mataika Viliame (born 1906 at Lau Islands, Fiji; died 1986 at Ono-i-Lau, Fiji) was a Fijian cricketer.

Viliame made his first-class debut for Fiji in 1948 against Auckland during Fiji's 1947/48 tour of New Zealand, where he played two first-class matches during the tour against Wellington and Auckland.

In his 3 first-class matches for Fiji he scored 50 runs at a batting average of 16.66, with a high score of 14*. With the ball he took 11 wickets at a bowling average of 19.27, with a single five wicket haul against Wellington in where he took 6/34 in Weelington's first innings.

Viliame also represented Fiji in 3 non first-class matches for Fiji on their 1947/48 tour.

Viliame died in 1986 at Ono-i-Lau, Fiji.

External links
Savu Viliame at Cricinfo
Savu Viliame at CricketArchive

1906 births
1986 deaths
People from Ono-i-Lau
Fijian cricketers
I-Taukei Fijian people